Ngga Pilimsit (or Mount Idenburg, its colonial name) is a mountain located in the Indonesian province of Papua, in the Maoke Mountains. It rises 4,717 meters (15,476 ft). It is a little over thirteen miles west-northwest of Puncak Jaya, the highest peak of Oceania and Indonesia. The nearest peaks are Carstensz Pyramid (Puncak Jaya), Wataikwa, Ubia, Venusberg, Otakwa, and Papua Peak 4061. Dependent on the definition used for an independent mountain, the peak ranks as the fourth to seventh highest mountain on New Guinea and in Indonesia.

See also 
 List of highest mountains of New Guinea
 List of Southeast Asian mountains

External links 
 Ngga Pilimsit - Peakery.com
 Ngga Pilimsit - Peakbagger.com

Mountains of Papua
Four-thousanders of New Guinea